Kyaw Min Oo (born 16 June 1996) is a Burmese professional footballer who plays as a midfielder for Malaysia Super League club PDRM and the Myanmar national team. He has represented Myanmar at Under-17, Under-20, Under-23, and full international level. In 2015, Kyaw represented Myanmar at the FIFA U-20 World Cup.

Biography
Kyaw Min Oo was born in Oktwin Township, Bago District. He studied in Myanmar Football Academy (Mandalay) for about three years. In 2014, Ayeyawady United signed Kyaw Min Oo. Kyaw Min Oo played two years for Ayeyawady United and then he moved to Yangon United at the end of his contract. Kyaw Min Oo first appeared in national under-16 team that took part in 2011 AFF U-16 Youth Championship before gradually rising to all levels of national teams. He is a playmaker with good passing, tackling, good vision. He played an important role in Myanmar under-20 national team for 2015 FIFA U-20 World Cup in New Zealand. He retired in early 2019, citing several injuries from 2016. In May 2019, he healed his injuries by help of Zaw Zaw and returned to the club.

Career statistics

International 

:Myanmar score listed first, score column indicates score after each Kyaw Min Oo goal

Honours
Hassanal Bolkiah Trophy: 2014
2015 General Aung San Shield: 2015

References

External links

Yangon United

1996 births
Living people
People from Bago Region
Burmese footballers
Myanmar international footballers
Association football forwards
Yangon United F.C. players